La Grue Bayou is a stream in Arkansas County, Arkansas, in the United States.

La Grue is derived from the French meaning "the crane".

See also
List of rivers of Arkansas

References

Rivers of Arkansas County, Arkansas
Rivers of Arkansas